Kiro Ristov (born 11 February 1953) is a Yugoslav wrestler. He competed at the 1976 Summer Olympics and the 1980 Summer Olympics.

References

1953 births
Living people
Yugoslav male sport wrestlers
Olympic wrestlers of Yugoslavia
Wrestlers at the 1976 Summer Olympics
Wrestlers at the 1980 Summer Olympics
Place of birth missing (living people)